Lee Jung-ha is a South Korean actor. He is best known for his roles in dramas such as Rookie Historian Goo Hae-ryung, Run On, and Nevertheless.

Biography and career
He was born on February 23, 1998, in South Korea. He liked acting on stages during his school days. He was cast by JYP Entertainment, he didn't know dancing and singing so he left and he later regretted. The very same year he pursued an acting career and made his debut in the web-series Heart Attack Warning. He also auditioned for The Unit. He later appeared in several dramas Run On, Rookie Historian Goo Hae-ryung and Nevertheless.

Filmography

Television series

Web series

References

External links
 
 

1998 births
Living people
21st-century South Korean male actors
South Korean male models
South Korean male television actors